Roberson Creek may refer to:

Streams
 Roberson Creek (Chatham County, North Carolina), a tributary to the Haw River
 Roberson Creek (Rutherford County, North Carolina), a tributary to the Second Broad River
 Roberson Creek (Gibson County, Tennessee), a tributary to Rutherford Fork of the Obion River
 Roberson Creek (Lincoln County, Wyoming), a tributary to Dry Muddy Creek

Churches
 Roberson Creek Church (Rutherford County, North Carolina)